POD 2: Multiplayer Online (released under the title POD: Speedzone in North America) was the sequel to the 1997 racing game POD, made by Ubisoft and available for Dreamcast in 2000.

Gameplay
In POD 2 the player had the option of connecting to the Internet to play against other people. The game takes place on a terraformed version of Saturn's largest moon Titan where a planet-wide viral outbreak has taken place. The premise of the game is that the only person who knows how to contain the virus will only assist the player if they race against him. There are a variety of courses that include volcanoes and deserts.

Development and release
A PlayStation 2 and a Microsoft Windows version were also planned for release in 2001, both developed by Ubisoft UK, but were scrapped.

In October 2017 the online portions of the game were brought back online thanks to fans.

Reception

The game received "average" reviews according to the review aggregation website Metacritic. Blake Fisher of NextGen said that the game was "As mediocre a racing experience as you can possibly buy."

References

External links
 

2000 video games
Cancelled PlayStation 2 games
Cancelled Windows games
Dreamcast games
Dreamcast-only games
Science fiction racing games
Racing video games
Ubisoft games
Video game sequels
Video games developed in Romania
Video games set on Titan (moon)
Video games about viral outbreaks
Multiplayer and single-player video games